Mohsenabad-e Pain (also Romanized as Moḩsenābād-e Pā’īn; also known as Moḩsenābād) is a village in Kiashahr Rural District, Kiashahr District, Astaneh-ye Ashrafiyeh County, Gilan Province, Iran. At the 2006 census, its population was 545, in 154 families.

References 

Populated places in Astaneh-ye Ashrafiyeh County